Pierzchały may refer to the following places:
Pierzchały, Przasnysz County in Masovian Voivodeship (east-central Poland)
Pierzchały, Węgrów County in Masovian Voivodeship (east-central Poland)
Pierzchały, Podlaskie Voivodeship (north-east Poland)
Pierzchały, Warmian-Masurian Voivodeship (north Poland)